Mike Binder (born June 2, 1958) is an American filmmaker, stand-up comedian, and actor.

Life and career
Binder, descended from Russian-Jewish immigrants, grew up in the Detroit suburb of Birmingham. During the summers of 1966 through 1975, he attended Camp Tamakwa, a summer camp in Algonquin Provincial Park in Ontario, Canada; that experience was the inspiration (and the filming location) for his 1993 film Indian Summer.

Beginning his career as a screenwriter and standup comedian,  in March 1990 with the March 9 theatrical premiere of his first screenplay, Coupe de Ville, directed by Joe Roth and co-produced by Binder, and his own HBO stand up comedy special, broadcast the following night.

Binder's directorial debut was with his second screenplay, 1992's Crossing the Bridge.

Binder gained further prominence with his 20-episode 2001-02 HBO comedy series, The Mind of the Married Man, which he co-wrote, co-directed and starred in as the central character "Micky Barnes".  That same year, his independently produced film  The Sex Monster won "Best Film" and Binder won "Best Actor" at the 2001 Comedy Arts Festival in Aspen.

Binder wrote and directed three mid-2000s films in which he also played supporting roles. The first, The Upside of Anger, starring Joan Allen and Kevin Costner, premiered at the January 2005 Sundance Film Festival; thirteen months later, Man About Town with Ben Affleck, was first seen at the February 2006 Santa Barbara International Film Festival and, after another 13 months, Reign Over Me was released; Binder directed, wrote, and appeared in the film, starring Adam Sandler and Don Cheadle. His most recent film is 2014's Black or White, starring Kevin Costner and Octavia Spencer.

As an actor, Binder has appeared in Steven Spielberg's Minority Report with Tom Cruise, Rod Lurie's The Contender with Joan Allen, and Rebecca Miller's The Private Lives of Pippa Lee with Robin Wright Penn.

Binder has directed most of the screenplays he has written, and has acted in many of them as well.  As a writer, he has written screenplays for Steven Spielberg, Julia Roberts, Robert Zemeckis, Jim Carrey, Adam Sandler, Tim Allen and Reese Witherspoon.

Binder's first novel, Keep Calm, a thriller set in the UK, was published in 2016. He directed stand-up comedian Bill Burr's most recent Netflix comedy special Paper Tiger. On October 4, 2020 his five-part documentary series on The Comedy Store, based on the years he spent there and interviews with most of the major alumni of the famous nightclub, aired on Showtime.

Filmography

References

External links

1958 births
Living people
American male comedians
American male film actors
American male screenwriters
American male television actors
American people of Russian-Jewish descent
Male actors from Detroit
People from Birmingham, Michigan
Film directors from Michigan
Jewish American writers
20th-century American male actors
21st-century American male actors
Screenwriters from Michigan
20th-century American comedians
21st-century American comedians
21st-century American Jews